Joe Rospars is one of the founders of  Blue State Digital and formerly the "Chief Strategist" for Elizabeth Warren's 2020 presidential campaign.  Rospars was the New Media Director for Barack Obama's presidential campaigns in both 2008 and 2012. Rospars also was Barack Obama's principal digital strategist and adviser. He managed the digital integration of fundraising, communications, and mobilization of grassroots effort. Prior to Obama's campaign, he worked with Governor Howard Dean at the Democratic National Committee, Dean's campaign for party chairman, and at Democracy for America, and on Howard Dean's 2004 presidential campaign. Rospers has a bachelor's degree in political science from the George Washington University.

References 

Barack Obama 2008 presidential campaign
Barack Obama 2012 presidential campaign
Columbian College of Arts and Sciences alumni
Living people
1981 births
Place of birth missing (living people)
American company founders
American chief executives